Terence Donovan (born 28 October 1942), also billed as Terence J. Donovan and Terry Donovan, is an English-Australian actor of stage and television, and the father of fellow actor and singer Jason Donovan (from his marriage to actress and journalist Sue McIntosh). 

Donovan is best known to audiences for his roles in soap opera including Neighbours as patriarch Doug Willis and in Home and Away as Al Simpson. He has appeared in Australian TV drama series since the 1960s, including police drama series Division 4 and Cop Shop, as well as minor parts in numerous serials including The Prisoner, Sons and Daughters, A Country Practice and E Street.

Career

Donovan, who was born in Staines, England, United Kingdom, has been a staple of Australian television since the early 1960s, when he had minor roles in episodes of the court-room drama series Consider Your Verdict, several ABC drama plays, and the children's series The Magic Boomerang. After moving back to the United Kingdom in the mid-1960s he had guest roles in series including The Champions, Man in a Suitcase, and The Prisoner. 

After returning to Australia and appearing in guest roles in the Crawford Productions series Homicide and Hunter in 1968, he was placed on contract, going on to appear in Division 4, as Detective Mick Peters from 1969 to 1975. In 1976, he played in a popular mini-series adaptation of the novel Power Without Glory by Frank Hardy. From 1979 to 1981, he starred in Cop Shop as Detective Sergeant Vic Cameron.

Between 1981 and 1984, he had minor roles in Australian television programs, and acted in the film The Man from Snowy River in 1982, playing Henry Craig. In 1985, he had roles in Prisoner and Sons and Daughters. From 1986 to 1990, he had more minor television roles including the 1989 pilot episode of E Street as Ken Swanson which was followed by guest roles in The Flying Doctors and G.P. 

in 1990 he starred in Home and Away as the second actor, after George Leppard, to play Al Simpson, the father of original character Bobby Simpson. He followed this immediately with the role in Neighbours of Doug Willis, a character he played regularly until 1994, and made a brief appearance in 2005, when he reprised his role for the show's 20th-anniversary special. He returned in that role again in 2014. 

Donovan appeared in a documentary special celebrating Neighbours 30th anniversary titled Neighbours 30th: The Stars Reunite, which aired in Australia and the UK in March 2015. He reprised the role of Doug Willis in episodes of the serial in 2016, culminating in the character's death. In 2003, he appeared in the drama series MDA in the role of Eric Savage, father of Richard Savage (played by his son Jason Donovan).

He played the title role of Harry 'Breaker' Morant in the first public performance of Kenneth G. Ross's Australian play Breaker Morant: A Play in Two Acts, presented by the Melbourne Theatre Company at the Athenaeum Theatre, in Melbourne, Victoria, Australia, on 2 February 1978. (Donovan also appeared in the 1980 film Breaker Morant, but in a subsidiary role, rather than as the title character). In the UK in the mid-1990s Donovan featured in a tour of a musical version of Peter Pan as Captain Hook alongside co-stars Nicola Stapleton, famous for her role in EastEnders, and a young Laurence Mark Wythe (who has since become a composer and lyricist in musical theatre). In 2007 Donovan performed the in the Magnormos production of Mary Bryant as Boswell. He also played in the Sydney Theatre Company production of Kander as slick, but dishonest lawyer Billy Flynn and Ebb's Chicago.

Filmography

References

External links
Interview with Terence Donovan at classicaustraliantv.com

1942 births
Living people
British emigrants to Australia
Australian people of English descent
Australian male television actors
English male television actors
Place of birth missing (living people)
People from Staines-upon-Thames